"Highway 61 Revisited" is the title track of Bob Dylan's 1965 album Highway 61 Revisited. It was also released as the B-side to the single "Can You Please Crawl Out Your Window?" later the same year. In 2004, Rolling Stone magazine ranked the song as number 364 in their 500 Greatest Songs of All Time.

Background 
Highway 61 runs from Duluth, Minnesota, where Bob Dylan grew up in the 1940s and 1950s down to New Orleans, Louisiana. It was a major transit route out of the Deep South particularly for African Americans traveling north to Chicago, St Louis and Memphis, following the Mississippi River valley for most of its .

Lyrics
The song has five stanzas. In each stanza, someone describes an unusual problem that is ultimately resolved on Highway 61. In Verse 1, God tells Abraham to "kill me a son". God wants the killing done on Highway 61. This stanza refers to Genesis 22, in which God commands Abraham to kill one of his two sons, Isaac. Abram, the original name of the biblical Abraham, is the name of Dylan's own father. Verse 2 describes a poor fellow, Georgia Sam, who is beyond the helping of the welfare department. He is told to go down Highway 61. Georgia Sam may be a reference to Piedmont blues musician Blind Willie McTell, who occasionally went by Georgia Sam when recording.

In the third verse, "Mack the Finger" has the problem of getting rid of particular absurd things: "I got forty red white and blue shoe strings / And a thousand telephones that don't ring". "Louie the King" solves the problem with Highway 61. Verse 4 is about the "fifth daughter" who on the "twelfth night" told the "first father" that her complexion is too pale. Agreeing, the father seeks to tell the "second mother," but she is with the "seventh son," on Highway 61. The inspiration for this verse may be drawn from the enumeration pattern at the beginning of the Old Testament book of Ezekiel.

The fifth and last verse is the story of a bored gambler, trying "to create the next world war." His promoter tells him to "put some bleachers out in the sun / And have it on Highway 61." There is an evident political undertone in this absurd tale. There is a pause in each verse while Dylan waits for some event in the story to finish; in the third verse, for example, the pause occurs while Louie the King attempts to resolve the shoestring-and-telephones problem.

Siren whistle
At the opening of the song, and between each verse, Dylan is heard blowing a siren whistle brought in by Sam Lay who was drummer on the Highway 61 sessions as noted by Tony Glover in the liner notes to Live 1966. Other accounts say that the whistle was brought in by Al Kooper. It is said that he had originally brought in the siren whistle to police the sessions. Supposedly, if someone were to begin doing drugs he would go into a corner and blow on the whistle. He later suggested to Dylan that he use the whistle in this song instead of his harmonica.

Reception
Cash Box described it as a "rollicking, warm-hearted twangy affair."

Cover versions
In 1969, Johnny Winter covered "Highway 61 Revisited" on his second Columbia release, Second Winter. Winter's rendition is regarded as "a career-defining track," and the song continued as a staple of his live performances. A 10-minute version of the song appears on his 1976 live album, Captured Live!, and he also performed it live in 1992 for The 30th Anniversary Concert Celebration album, which saluted Dylan's three decades as a recording artist.

Ex-Dr Feelgood guitarist Wilko Johnson included "Highway 61 Revisited" in his concert sets in the late 1970s and released a live recording of the song on an EP given away with his 1978 album Solid Senders. The recording now forms part of the album's CD release. In 1987, Dr Feelgood also covered the song for their album Classic, a track AllMusic describes as "utterly inspired."

The song has been recorded by P.J. Harvey on her 1993 album Rid of Me. Paste magazine selected this version as the 15th best cover of a Dylan song of all time, while also paying homage to "Johnny Winter's classic electric-blues version."

References

External links
"Highway 61 Revisited" lyrics from bobdylan.com
[  Review by William Ruhlmann in AllMusic]

Songs written by Bob Dylan
Bob Dylan songs
U.S. Route 61
1965 songs
Song recordings produced by Bob Johnston
Songs about roads
Blues songs
American garage rock songs